Periyapatti is a census town in Tiruppur district in the Indian state of Tamil Nadu.

Geography
It has an average elevation of 309 metres (1013 feet).

Demographics
 India census, Periyapatti had a population of 10,333. Males constitute 51% of the population and females 49%. Periyapatti has an average literacy rate of 69%, higher than the national average of 59.5%: male literacy is 76%, and female literacy is 62%. In Periyapatti, 12% of the population is under 6 years of age.

References

Cities and towns in Tiruppur district